Jacob Gilboa (Hebrew: יהודה יעקוב גלבוע) (May 2, 1920 – May 9, 2007) was an Israeli composer.

Biography
Erwin Goldberg (later Jacob Gilboa) was born in Košice, Czechoslovakia. Some years later he lived in Vienna, where he received training in playing the piano. In 1938 he immigrated to Palestine, where he initially studied in Haifa at the Institute for Technology. Starting in 1944 he studied at the Jerusalem Academy of Music with Josef Tal and Paul Ben-Haim.

Music career
His participation in the Courses for New Music in Cologne in 1963 and 1964 under Karlheinz Stockhausen and Henri Pousseur made a strong impact on his style, which changed to include clusters, quarter tones, electronics, and unconventional instrumental combinations.

His best-known work is Twelve Glass Windows of Chagall in Jerusalem, for voice and instruments (1966). In addition, he composed Thistles, for horn, percussion, piano, and cello  (1967), Pastels for two pianos, the piano suite Seven Little Insects (1956), and The Grey Colours of Käthe Kollwitz for mezzo-soprano, chamber orchestra, and tape.

He died in Tel Aviv, Israel.

See also
Music of Israel

References

1920 births
2007 deaths
Israeli composers
20th-century classical composers
21st-century classical composers
Pupils of Karlheinz Stockhausen
Male classical composers
20th-century male musicians
21st-century male musicians
Czechoslovak expatriates in Austria
Czechoslovak emigrants to Mandatory Palestine